Società Sportiva Dilettantistica Ischia Calcio (formerly Societa Sportiva Ischia Isolaverde, better known simply as Ischia) is an amateur Italian association football club located in Ischia, Campania. It currently plays in Eccellenza, the fifth tier of Italian football.

History

The team has played in Serie C2 from 1983 to 1987, and then Serie C1 until 1990, when Ischia relegated to Serie C2. Ischia returned to Serie C1 the next year, and played in the third-highest ranked Italian division until 1998, when the club was cancelled by the federation due to financial troubles.

Scudetto Dilettanti 2012–13 and back into professionalism
In 2012–13, Ischia was promoted to Lega Pro Seconda Divisione and won also the Scudetto Dilettanti under the guidance of head coach Salvatore Campilongo. The club's first season back into professionalism was more troublesome as head coach Campilongo was sacked during the season and replaced with Antonio Porta, who led the club to a respectable seventh place and a spot in the inaugural season of the unified Lega Pro league, the new third tier of Italian football. After the end of the season, chairman Raffaele Carlino (a national clothing entrepreneur) relinquished his role in the board, remaining only as main club sponsor, and former Napoli goalkeeper and Ischia local Giuseppe Taglialatela was named as new chairman.

Honours
Serie D:
Scudetto Dilettanti: Winners 1: 2012–13
Winners (1): 2012–13

 
Football clubs in Campania
Ischia
Serie C clubs
1922 establishments in Italy